Schloss Bredebeck ("Bredebeck House") was built in 1901/1902 by a farmer, Herr Hellberg. It is actually a manor house in terms of its size and function. The house is located in woodland in the German state of Lower Saxony between the former villages of Hörsten and Hohne, which disappeared in the 1930s in the wake of the establishment of Bergen-Hohne Training Area. In 1936, the Bredebeck estate was incorporated into the training area and, since then, has not been accessible to the general public. It became part of the British Army's estate at Bergen-Hohne Garrison.

History 

In old documents from 1476 and 1511 the place is referred to as tom Bredtbeck and in 1589 as Bretbeck. There was a stream, the Liethbach, a tributary of the Meiße, that used to exist in the vicinity of the former farm and which led to a large forest called the Breede. Hence the name Bredebeck ("Breede Beck"). In the 1476 document it is recorded that the v. Bothmer brothers (Ernst, Gebhard and Kurt) sold the farm of tom Bredbeck to Heinrich, Otto und Lambert von Dageförde. Later, between 1563 and 1700, farmers with the names Bredbeck, Bredebeck and Bretbeck  lived on the farm.

In 1877, the farmer, Gustav Hellberg, abandoned the traditional heath farming typical of the area. He sold his moorland sheep, the Heidschnucken, because neither their wool nor their meat fetched good prices. He switched to sheep fattening, introduced artificial fertilizer, laid out strawberry and asparagus fields and grew fruit trees. He even tried amelioration by digging ditches and sanding the surface of the boggy terrain (so-called Moordammkultur), but with little success.

On 23 November 1909 the farm and manor building were sold for 160,000 Reichsmarks to an Army officer, Major (retired) von Rosen. In 1922, he sold the house in turn to a lawyer, Adolf Kühling. In 1932 the property was transferred to Ernst Kühling. In 1936 the manor was incorporated into the terrain of the then Bergen Military Training Area. From 1945 to 2015 it was an officers' mess belonging to the resident British cavalry regiment, the last unit there being the armoured reconnaissance regiment, the 9th/12th Royal Lancers (Prince of Wales's). Occasionally the British used the mess as a guest house. It was even used as such by the British Royal Family as accommodation when members of the royal household visit the British Army in Germany. In December 2011, Prince Andrew was invited here. In his capacity as the Colonel-in-Chief of the Regiment, he paid tribute to the soldiers of the Royal Lancers after they had returned in November following a seven-month deployment to Afghanistan. The house was returned to the German government when the British garrison closed in summer 2015.

Estate 

In Lower Saxony's inventory of listed buildings the manor and its gardens are described in detail in the state they were in 1970. An extract:

Gardens 

Description of the gardens. Extract from Lower Saxony's inventory of listed buildings (as at 1970):

References

Bibliography 
 Die Kunstdenkmale des Landkreises Celle. Textband l, Hannover/Osnabrück, 1970/1980.
 Matthias Blazek: 1936 übernimmt die Deutsche Wehrmacht Gut Bredebeck von Familie Kühling / Gebäude in Truppenübungsplatz Bergen einbezogen – Nach dem Krieg Unterkunft für die Briten, Sachsenspiegel 21, Cellesche Zeitung, 21 May 2016

External links 

Bredebeck
Heidmark
Houses completed in 1902
Installations of the British Army